Mon State is an administrative division of Myanmar. It lies between Kayin State to the east, the Andaman Sea to the west, Bago Region to the north and Tanintharyi Region to the south, also having a short border with Thailand's Kanchanaburi Province at its south-eastern tip. The Dawna Range, running along the eastern side of the state in a NNW–SSE direction, forms a natural border with Kayin State. Mon State includes some small islands, such as Kalegauk, Wa Kyun and Kyungyi Island, along its  of coastline. The state's capital is Mawlamyine.

History

Mon tradition holds that the Suwarnabhumi mentioned in the Edicts of Ashoka and the Dîpavamsa was their first kingdom (pronounced Suvanna Bhoum), founded around the port of Thaton in about 300 BC, however, this is disputed by scholars.

Oral tradition suggests that they had contact with Buddhism via seafaring as early as the 3rd century BCE, though definitely by the 2nd century BCE when they received an envoy of monks from Ashoka. The Mon converted to Theravada Buddhism sometime before the sixth century, and they adopted the Indian Pali script. Much of the Mon's written records have been destroyed through wars. The Mons blended Indian and Mon cultures in a hybrid of the civilisations. By 825 they had firmly established themselves in southern and southeastern Myanmar and founded the cities of Bago (Pegu) and Thaton. By the mid-9th century, they had come to dominate all of southern Myanmar.

Mon kingdoms

The first recorded kingdom that can undisputedly be attributed to the Mon was Dvaravati which prospered until around 1024 AD when their capital was sacked by the Khmer Empire and most of the inhabitants fled west to present-day Myanmar and eventually founded new kingdoms. These, too, eventually came under pressure from new ethnic groups arriving from the north.

Advent of the British
Lower Burma, including what is now Mon State, was conquered by Great Britain in 1824 after the First Anglo-Burmese War. The Mon assisted the British in the war, in return for promises of their own leadership after the defeat of Burma. Hundreds of thousands of Mons who had migrated into Siam returned to their homeland when it came under British rule. However, British promises to restore the Mon Kingdom were never fulfilled. During colonial times, Moulmein had a substantial Anglo-Burmese population; an area of the city was known as 'Little England' due to the large Anglo-Burmese community. Nowadays this community has dwindled to a handful of families as most have left for the UK or Australia.

Burmese independence
In 1947, the Mon sought self-determination from the yet unformed Union of Burma. Burmese Prime Minister U Nu refused, saying that no separate national rights for the Mon should be contemplated. The Burmese army moved into areas claimed by the Mon nationalists and imposed rule by force which resulted in a civil war. Mon separatists formed the Mon Peoples Front, which was later superseded by the New Mon State Party (NMSP) in 1962. Since 1949, the eastern hills of the state (as well as portions of Thaninthaya Division) have been under control of the NMSP and its military arm, the Mon National Liberation Front (MNLF). In addition to fighting the central government, the MNLF has fought the Karen people over control of lucrative border crossings into Thailand.

In 1974, partially to assuage Mon separatist demands, the theoretically autonomous Mon State was created out of portions of Thaninthayi Division and Bago Division. Resistance continued until 1995, when NMSP and SLORC agreed a cease-fire. In 1996, the Mon Unity League was founded. SLORC troops continued to operate in defiance of the agreement.

Government

Executive
Mon State Government

Legislative

Judiciary
Mon State High Court

Demographics

The population was 2,054,393 according to 2014 Census. The majority are Mon. However, there is a large number of ethnic Bamar, as well as members of the Kayin and Pa-O ethnic groups and a small, dwindling Anglo-Burmese community. Many are isolated and many do not understand or speak Burmese. There is a Thai Community in Kyaikkami. The majority of people are Buddhist.

Religion 
According to the 2014 Myanmar Census, Buddhists make up 92.6% of Mon State’s population, forming the largest religious community there. Minority religious communities include Christians (0.5%), Muslims (5.8%), and Hindus (1%) who collectively comprise the remainder of Mon State’s population. 0.1% of the population listed no religion, other religions, or were otherwise not enumerated.

According to the State Sangha Maha Nayaka Committee’s 2016 statistics, 32,769 Buddhist monks were registered in Mon State, comprising 6.1% of Myanmar's total Sangha membership, which includes both novice samanera and fully-ordained bhikkhu. The majority of monks belong to the Thudhamma Nikaya (79.8%), followed by Shwegyin Nikaya (14.9%), with the remainder of monks belonging to other small monastic orders. 3,550 thilashin were registered in Mon State, comprising 5.9% of Myanmar’s total thilashin community.

Geography 
Bordering Bago Division in the south of Sittaung River Mouth, Kayin State in the east, Thailand and Taninthayi Division in the south and Andaman Sea and Gulf of Mottama in the West, Mon state is situated between latitudes 14°52′ north and 17°32′ north and longitudes 96°51′ east and 98°13′ east.

Climate and weather
Mon State has a tropical climate. It has temperate weather as it is located in the low latitude zone and near the sea. The state has only slight changes in temperature. Rain is especially heavy in July and August.

Economy
The major secondary crop is rubber. Orchards and rubber plantations are found in the mountainous areas while Coastal fishing and related industries such as production of dried fish, fish sauce and agar-agar are in southern part, Ye district. Production of Betel nut is also a sustaining business of Mon state, as the Mon peasants preserved their heredity land onwards along with the government regulations, however, there are some many parts of uncultivated crude land in the area closed to neighbour Karen state. Moreover, modern business development includes growing of cashew trees (acajoú, in Portuguese), from which they collect the cashew nut for market elsewhere.

Other industries include paper, sugar, rubber tires. Thaton has a major factory (Burmese, Ka-Sa-La) of rubber products run by Ministry of Industry (1). Forests cover approximately half of the area and timber production is one of the major contributors to the economy. Minerals extracted from the area include salt, antimony, and granite. Natural resources such as forest products, and onshore and offshore mineral resources, are exploited only by top Myanmar military leaders and foreign companies. At the present time one of the biggest foreign investments into Myanmar is for the exploitation of natural gas reserves in Mon State. The Yadana Gas project which connected pipelines alongside the towns of Mon state made harassed danger to the native Mon land and Mon people.

In Mudon, a small town near Mawlamyine, there is an applied research center for agricultural science with laboratory bases in rubber plantation and fertilization of some other species.

The future plans with tourism will benefit Mon state a lot as it has excellent transportation with the  capital Yangon. Transportation routes include Train, Bus, Sea line and Airlines. The newly opened Mawlamyine Bridge gives quick access from southern Ye to North Bago and Yangon by a day journey. Three Pagoda Pass is an alternative route which communicates Mon state with neighbour Kanchanaburi province of Thailand.

According to the Mon State Directorate of Investment and Company, foreign direct investment from 1994 to 2016 in Mon State was more than 5.433 billion US dollar.

Transport
Ye Airport
Mawlamyine Airport

Administrative divisions

Mon state has a capital of Mawlamyine, the fourth largest city in Myanmar. It was formerly known as Moulmein under the British colonial rule till the late 1980s. Administrative body is set under South Eastern Regional Command of Myanmar Army in Mawlamyine and Mawyawaddy Navy Command controls coastline security. There are dispersed army infantry battalions at many towns in Mon state, and Thaton has a Light Infantry Division (44th). Major districts are divided for example, Mawlamyine, Thaton, and Ye districts. At present, army infantries are densely placed in the former neutral territory of Ye district for future plans. Ye has become the major city for Southern Mon State with Sector Operation Command of Air Defense, and Military Operations Command 19 based headquarters.

Mon State consists of two districts:

Mawlamyine District
Thaton District

Cities and towns and villages

Education

The following is a summary of the public school system in the state in the academic year 2002–2003.

Almost all institutions of higher education in the state are located in Mawlamyine. Mawlamyine University is the main university and the largest university in the state.

Health care
The general state of health care in Myanmar is poor. Although health care is nominally free, in reality, patients have to pay for medicine and treatment, even in public clinics and hospitals. Public hospitals have limited number of basic facilities and equipment. The following is a summary of the public health system in the state, in the fiscal year 2002–2003.

Notable sites

Kyaiktiyo Pagoda: A famous religious site with a steeple built on a rock covered with gold leaf, precariously balanced on the site of a cliff.
Kyaikhtisaung Pagoda: A famous pagoda said to hold a hair of the Gautama Buddha.
Kaylartha Pagoda: A famous pagoda on Kaylartha Mountain where the Buddha is said to have landed.
Thaton: Thaton was the capital of the Thaton Kingdom, which ruled present-day Lower Burma between the 9th and 11th centuries. 
Mudon Kangyi Pagoda: It lies on the hill west of the vast lake east of Mudon. 
Win Sein reclining Buddha: It is the world's largest reclining buddha at Mudon.
Thanbyuzayat War Cemetery & Death Railway Museum
Setse Beach & Kyaik-kami
Kyaikmaraw Paya: A huge Buddha image built in AD 1455 by Queen Shin Saw Pu, the only female ruler in the history of Myanmar.
Belu-kyun (Bilu island): It is located opposite to Mawlamyine, and is famous for traditional handmade products.
Zinkyaik Pagoda: An ancient pagoda on top of Zinkyaik Mountain and former home of Hermits Tissa and Thiha

See also
Mon State Cultural Museum
Ramannadesa

References

External links
 Kaowao News Group
 Mawlamyaing culture
 Monzel.be (in Burmese)

 
States of Myanmar
1974 establishments in Burma
States and territories established in 1974
Andaman Sea